Choi Su-bin (born October 14, 1988) is a South Korean football player who currently plays for Mokpo City.

Club statistics

References

External links
 
 

1988 births
Living people
South Korean footballers
South Korean expatriate footballers
Incheon United FC players
Matsumoto Yamaga FC players
K League 1 players
Korea National League players
J2 League players
South Korean expatriate sportspeople in Japan
Expatriate footballers in Japan
Association football forwards